The Ipswich Australian Football Club is an Australian rules football club located in Ipswich, Queensland, Australia. The club emblem is the Eagle and the club plays in the third Division of the SEQAFL Div 3. The Ipswich Eagles Football Club is not affiliated with the Ipswich Cats Football Club.

History

Club History
Australian Rules Football within Ipswich has an extremely strong heritage and long-standing history. It has been played here over the last hundred years in various grades and by various teams with mixed levels of success.
The Ipswich Eagles Australian Football Club (AFC) has been providing an invaluable service to the local community for 55 years now and has undergone some major changes in venue movement, naming of club, jersey design and playing culture.
The Ipswich Eagles AFC was established in 2001 when the former Royal Australian Air Force (RAAF) Eagles relocated from the RAAF Base at Amberley, to Limestone Park in the centre of Ipswich.
The club was formed in 1966 as the RAAF Eagles. A RAAF team playing in the local BAFL competition.
The RAAF Eagles home was on RAAF Base Amberley next to the front gate where you can still see the old goal posts.
During the RAAF years, the club won the following Premierships: 1976 Division 2, 1980 Division 3, 1999 Division 2 Reserves.
In 2000 after struggling to find players all season following the contracting out of all of the F111 maintenance activities, the club members voted to rename the club. Ipswich Eagles AFC was born and relocated to Limestone Park in the centre of Ipswich for the start of the 2001 season.
Now no longer a club primarily focused on defence personnel, Ipswich locals flocked to the club happy to have a place to play senior football.
The Ipswich Eagles AFC is now a civilian club but still understands and caters for the special needs of players who are also defence personnel. We still have many members who are current or former ADF members.
Since the move in 2001 the senior teams have featured in the finals almost every year as well as playing off in 6 grand finals.
Six of the club's players have also been named Best and Fairest in their division as voted by the umpires. These players are:
2003 Gregory Jenkins - Division 2, Reserves
2004 Luke Konstanciak - Division 2, Seniors
2005 Luke Konstanciak - Division 1, Seniors
2005 Mark Kennedy - Division 1, Reserves
2007 Luke Konstanciak - Division 2, Seniors
2015 Keith Brick - QAFA (A), Seniors.
2017 Justyn Bilston - Division 3, Reserves
2019 Samara Mahoney - Division 2 North, Senior Women
In 2003 a new dimension was added to the club with the inclusion of a women's team into the AFLQWL competition. The women played 3 seasons which included one grand final and disbanded. In 2017 the women's team took the field again and went on to win the 2019 Premiership.
2004 saw the club form its first U18's side which played as the Ipswich Miners to better represent the junior clubs in the area from which the side draws its players. This side no longer exists but many of these U18 players went on to play senior football for the club. Lauchie McHardie was awarded a League Best & Fairest in this period.
Our juniors were introduced in 2015 with just 6 kids representing the club in U6's. In 2019 we boasted 121 junior Eagles players with that figure expected to grow to over 150 in 2020.
Our U13 girls combined with a team from Forest Lake in 2019 and also won the premiership.
We also had two players go on to AFL clubs. Rhan Hooper played for the Brisbane Lions and Hawthorn Hawks and Matthew Uebergang was drafted by the Fremantle Football Club.
The future is looking super strong with so many juniors playing for our proud club.
The Ipswich Eagles AFC is the premier Australian Rules Football Club in the Ipswich and West Moreton region offering senior men, women and juniors the chance to play Australia's greatest game.
The 2020 season will see the Ipswich Eagles fielding teams for senior men and women, junior boys and girls and with the hope to also expand to U18's again in the near future.

Premierships
 
 List of Premierships: 1 Women 2019
 Grand Final Appearances (6):
 2004, 2005, 2012 (Reserves),2017, 2018, 2019 (Women)

References

External links
 Ipswich Eagles AFC on Facebook

Australian rules football clubs in Queensland
2001 establishments in Australia
Australian rules football clubs established in 2001
Sport in Ipswich, Queensland